Naujaat, known until 2 July 2015 as Repulse Bay, is an Inuit hamlet situated on the Arctic Circle. It is located on the shores of Hudson Bay, at the south end of the Melville Peninsula, in the Kivalliq Region of Nunavut, Canada.

Location and wildlife

Naujaat is at the north end of Roes Welcome Sound which separates Southampton Island from the mainland. On the east side of Naujaat Frozen Strait leads east to Foxe Channel. The hamlet is located exactly on the Arctic Circle, on the north shore of Naujaat and on the south shore of the Rae Isthmus. Transport to the community is provided primarily by air and by an annual sealift. Naujaat is home to a wide variety of animals including polar bears, caribou, seals, whales, and walrus. There are also approximately one hundred species of birds in the area, including gyrfalcons and peregrine falcons.

History
Naujaat is translated into English variously as "seagull fledgling," "seagull resting place" or "seagulls' nesting place," named after a cliff  to the north, where seagulls, migrating from the south each June, make their nests. Naujaat was first visited by Europeans in the 1740s, and by the late 1800s it became a popular whaling ground for American and Scottish whalers. Many Naujaat Inuit residents worked on board these whaling vessels from the south. Although there are various theories as to the origin of the English name "Repulse Bay," many attribute the name to Christopher Middleton, who when searching for the Northwest Passage in 1742 discovered that the bay was not a route out of Hudson Bay, but rather a cul-de-sac. He is claimed to have called it the "Bay of Repulse, the bay where I was pushed away". Others believe that the name comes from an 18th-century English vessel named Repulse which visited the area. The Hudson's Bay Company opened a post in Naujaat about 1916 and in 1923 a rival fur trading company, Revillon Frères, opened a post. A Roman Catholic Mission was built in 1932. Naujaat was formerly part of the District of Keewatin and the Keewatin Region; in 1999 the area became part of the Kivalliq Region.

On 12 May 2014, a by-election was held to elect a new mayor which was won by Solomon Malliki. At the same time a non-binding plebiscite was held to gauge how the community felt about restoring the traditional name, Naujaat. With voter turnout at 36% there were 82 people in favour and 73 opposed to the name change. The name was officially changed on 2 July 2015.

Naujaat today 
The Naujaat community continues to rely on traditional sealing, fishing, hunting, trapping, and carving for their livelihood, together with tourism. Naujaat is known for its Inuit artists, especially carvers (typically creating small realist animal sculptures of ivory, soapstone, marble and antler), as well as jewellery and crafts. Its people are the 'Aivilingmiut'.

It is served by Naujaat Airport.

Demographics 

Broadband communications 
Both Qiniq and NorthwesTel have operations in Naujaat. Since late 2018, Qiniq has offered 4G LTE and 2G-GSM technology for mobile users in Naujaat.

Climate
Naujaat has a tundra climate (Köppen ET) with short but cool summers and long, cold winters.

Notable people 

 Cecilia Angmadlok Angutialuk (born 1938), artist and sculptor
 Jack Anawak (born 1950), politician
 Peter Irniq (born 1947), politician
 Madeleine Isserkut Kringayak (1928–1984), sculptor and jewelry artist
 Jose Kusugak (1950–2011), politician
 Michael Kusugak (born 1948), storyteller and children's writer

See also

 List of municipalities in Nunavut
 Ukkusiksalik National Park
 Tuugaalik High School

References

Further reading
 "Conducting a Trading Post Farthest North - A Life That Gets into the Blood of a Man" - May 18, 1924 New Bedford Sunday Standard article on the Repulse Bay HBC post in the early 1920s.

External links

 Repulse Bay official website

Hudson's Bay Company trading posts in Nunavut
Hamlets in the Kivalliq Region
Road-inaccessible communities of Nunavut